Mohammad Murad (Arabic: محمد مراد; born 1976) is a Kuwaiti wildlife photographer who specializes in bird photography. His photos have won awards such as the 2017–2018 Hamdan bin Mohammed bin Rashid Al Maktoum International Photography Award (HIPA) Merit Medal.

Murad's photos have been featured in BBC News, National Geographic, Business Insider, the Kuwait Times, USA Today, and other publications.

Early life and education
Murad was born in Kuwait in 1976. He became interested in photography after watching his father take family photos and videos. Murad has a degree in Communication Engineering. Outside of photography, he works as a communication engineer in TV broadcasting.

Career
Murad purchased his first professional camera in 2014 and began his photography career by joining the Kuwait Voluntary Work Center's Photography & Documentary Team. Later in the year, he joined the Birds Monitoring & Protecting Team at the Kuwait Environment Protection Society.

In 2015, he received his first photography awards, winning an Honorable Mention at the ND Awards and winning 2nd place at the 2015 Monochrome Awards for his black-and-white photo of a white-tailed eagle, which he took in Hungary. Murad was awarded the Merit Medal in 2018 by the Hamdan bin Mohammed bin Rashid Al Maktoum International Photography Award (HIPA) for his black-and-white photography. 

He won first prize in the Artistic Vision category at the Festival de l'Oiseau et de la Nature International Wildbird Photo Competition in 2019.

In 2020, Murad won the Remarkable Artwork Award in the "Animals in Their Environment" category at the Siena International Photo Awards. Murad also won second place in the Urban Wildlife category at the Nature TTL Photographer of the Year Competition in 2021.

Selected awards
2017–2018: Merit Medal Recipient, Hamdan bin Mohammed bin Rashid Al Maktoum International Photography Award (HIPA)
2018: First Place – Baby Animals, The National Wildlife Federation Magazine Photo Contest
2019: Second Place – Amphibians and Reptiles, The National Wildlife Federation Magazine Photo Contest
2019: Honorable Mention – Animals in Their Environment, Siena International Photo Awards
2020: Remarkable Artwork – Animals in Their Environment, Siena International Photo Awards
2021: Runner-Up – Urban Wildlife Category, Nature TTL Photographer of the Year Competition

References

1976 births
Living people
Kuwaiti photographers
Nature photographers